The Jeevan Bahadur Shahi cabinet is the council assembled by Jeevan Bahadur Shahi, who was sworn in as Chief Minister of Karnali Province on 3 November 2021. This government was supported by CPN(Maoist-Centre) and CPN (Unified Socialist).

Chief Minister and Cabinet Ministers

Member by party

See also 

 Rajendra Kumar Rai cabinet
 Lalbabu Raut cabinet
 Rajendra Prasad Pandey cabinet
 Krishna Chandra Nepali Cabinet
 Kul Prasad KC cabinet
 Trilochan Bhatta cabinet

References 

Government of Karnali Province
Provincial cabinets of Nepal
2023 disestablishments in Nepal